Warren County is a county in the U.S. state of Illinois. According to the 2010 census, it had a population of 17,707. Its county seat is Monmouth.

History
Warren County was organized in 1825 out of Pike County which consisted of all portions of the state north and west of the Illinois River before 1825. Henderson County was formed in 1841 from the western area of Warren County.

Warren County was named for Dr. Joseph Warren, killed at the Battle of Bunker Hill in 1775. He is believed to have been the first officer to die in the Revolutionary War.

The current courthouse, constructed of red Portage stone, was completed in 1895.

Geography

Climate and weather

Adjacent counties
 Mercer County (north)
 Knox County (east)
 Fulton County (southeast)
 McDonough County (south)
 Henderson County (west)

Demographics

At the 2010 United States Census, there were 17,707 people, 6,918 households and 4,617 families residing in the county. The racial makeup of the county was 91.3% white, 1.7% black or African American, 0.5% Asian, 0.2% American Indian, 0.1% Pacific islander, 4.5% from other races, and 1.6% from two or more races. Those of Hispanic or Latino origin made up 8.4% of the population. In terms of ancestry, 25.2% were German, 14.7% were Irish, 11.3% were English, 10.0% were Swedish, and 5.5% were American.

Of the 6,918 households, 29.6% had children under the age of 18 living with them, 52.2% were married couples living together, 9.7% had a female householder with no husband present, 33.3% were non-families, and 28.2% of all households were made up of individuals. The average household size was 2.40 and the average family size was 2.91. The median age was 39.6 years.

The median household income was $41,636 and the median family income was $49,623. Males had a median income of $40,289 and females $25,460. The per capita incomewas $20,047. About 11.0% of families and 13.4% of the population were below the poverty line, including 18.1% of those under age 18 and 10.6% of those age 65 or over.

Politics
Warren County is located in Illinois's 17th Congressional District and is currently represented by Democrat Cheri Bustos. For the Illinois House of Representatives, the county is split between the 93rd district, currently represented by Republican Norine Hammond, and the 94th district, currently represented by Randy Frese. The county is located in the 47th district of the Illinois Senate, and is currently represented by Republican Jil Tracy.

In presidential elections, Warren County voted for the Republican Party's candidate in every election from 1936 through 1988, often by a wide margin. From 1992 to 2012, the contest in Warren County was more competitive, with the Democratic Party's candidate  winning four out of six times.

Transportation

Transit
 List of intercity bus stops in Illinois

Airport
 Monmouth Municipal Airport

Major highways
   U.S. Highway 34
   U.S. Highway 67
   Illinois Route 94
  Illinois Route 116
  Illinois Route 135
  Illinois Route 164

Law enforcement

State
 Illinois State Police District 14, Macomb

County
 Warren County Sheriff's Office
In a scene in the 2018 film "Halloween", the local sheriff drives a car that says Warren County Sheriff's Department. Confirming that the fictional town of Haddonfield is located in Warren County.

Municipal
 Alexis Police Department, Alexis
 Monmouth Police Department, Monmouth

Volunteer
Warren County/Monmouth Auxiliary Police Corps

Communities

City
 Monmouth

Villages
 Alexis (partly in Mercer County)
 Kirkwood
 Little York
 Roseville

Unincorporated communities

 Berwick
 Cameron
 Coldbrook
 Eleanor
 Gerlaw
 Greenbush
 Larchland
 Ormonde
 Ponemah
 Shanghai City
 Smithshire
 Swan Creek
 Utah
 Youngstown

Townships
Warren County is divided into these townships:

 Berwick
 Cold Brook
 Ellison
 Floyd
 Greenbush
 Hale
 Kelly
 Lenox
 Monmouth
 Point Pleasant
 Roseville
 Spring Grove
 Sumner
 Swan
 Tompkins

See also
 National Register of Historic Places listings in Warren County, Illinois

References

External links
 Warren County Circuit Court
 Welcome to Warren Co., IL AHGP

 
Illinois counties
1825 establishments in Illinois
Populated places established in 1825
Galesburg, Illinois micropolitan area